The Botevgrad dialect is a Bulgarian dialect, member of the Southwestern Bulgarian dialects, which is spoken in the region of Botevgrad and Etropole in northwestern Bulgaria. It is located on the yat boundary and is closely related to the Eastern Bulgarian Pirdop dialect.

Phonological and morphological characteristics
 Vowel a for Old Church Slavonic  (yus), ь and ъ: маж vs. formal Bulgarian мъж (man), сан vs. formal Bulgarian  (sleep). However, Old Church Slavonic  has resulted in o in the prepositions and prefixes във and въз: вов водата vs. formal Bulgarian  (in the water). The schwa is usually pronounced only in Turkish words, e.g.  (copper)
 Lack of iotation between two vowels:  (also ) vs. formal Bulgarian  (to dig)
 The masculine definite article is -a, as in the Pirdop dialect: кра'ка (the leg)
 Verb ending -a instead of formal Bulgarian -ъ in verbs of the first and second conjugation: чет'а vs. formal Bulgarian  (I read)
 Future tense particle is ща for 1st person and ще for all other persons ( in all cases in Standard Bulgarian)
 Personal pronouns for 3rd person той, т҄а, то, тиа (то, те in Standard Bulgarian)

For other phonological and morphological characteristics typical for all Southwestern dialects, cf. Southwestern Bulgarian dialects.

Sources
Стойков, Стойко: Българска диалектология, Акад. изд. "Проф. Марин Дринов", 2006

References 

Dialects of the Bulgarian language